Thomas Allen was a member of the Irish Volunteers who fought and died in the 1916 rising in the Four Courts in Dublin.

Background
Thomas Allen was born in Longwood Co. Meath in 1883. While Allen was young his mother died and he and his sister moved a few miles away to their grandparents house at Ballasport in the Hill of Down. Having learned his trade locally as a boot maker Allen relocated to Dublin to seek employment.

Irish Volunteers
Allen joined the Irish Volunteers in 1914 and was attached to C Company of the Dublin Brigade. In July 1914 he was involved in the Howth gun-running where the Irish Volunteers secured arms. 
On Easter Monday when the 1916 Easter Rising began Allen was stationed in the Four Courts where Ned Daly commanded the Volunteers.

Four days into the rising Allen was shot by a machine gun blast from a group of British soldiers advancing through Smithfield while barricading a window. Fellow Longwood native Eamonn Duggan, who was also serving with the Irish volunteers in the Four Courts attempted to get medical assistance from Richmond Hospital for Allen but the British officer in charge of the exchange refused to allow the message through and by the time medical attention was received it was too late and Allen died. He was 29 years old at the time of his death.

Initially buried in Glasnevin Cemetery Tom Allen’s remains were reburied in Kilglass cemetery in Longwood in 1917. He was survived by his wife, three sons and a daughter.

References

Notes

1916 deaths
People from County Meath
People of the Easter Rising